Sphodros niger, the black purse-web spider, is a mygalomorph spider from the Eastern United States. It is listed as a special concern species in Connecticut.

Description
Males have a body length of about 11 mm, 29 mm with extended legs. The body is black, except for chocolate-brown legs. Although the species was first described in 1842, females were first described in 1980. This results from the male's behavior of wandering about in search of mates, while females, which reside in tubes, are rarely found.

Name
The species name niger is Latin for "black".

References

Further reading
Gertsch, W.J. & Platnick, N.I. (1980). A revision of the American spiders of the family Atypidae (Araneae, Mygalomorphae). American Museum Novitates 2704. Abstract - PDF (12Mb)

Atypidae
Spiders of the United States
Spiders described in 1842